The Hollywood High School E. M. Skinner Organ Opus 481-A is a pipe organ in Hollywood High School, in Hollywood, Los Angeles, California. The contract for Opus 481 was made in June 1924, shortly after Skinner returned from his second trip to England and France.  It took two years to build the organ.  The organ was expanded (the Swell 4′ Octave and 4′ Clarion) in 1929 by Skinner. When the 1929 Memorial auditorium was built, the organ was moved and also registered as Opus 481-A.  Then in 1954 it was placed into storage when the auditorium was refurbished, torn down to its foundation and rebuilt in its present form.  Opus 481 is considered to be of musical value, built by the "Cadillac" of symphonic organ builders of the 20th century. The historic organ is an E. M. Skinner Opus 481 of 3-manuals, 39 ranks with chimes and has over 2,600 pipes. 

Given to the school by the class of 1924 it was originally located on the west wall in the original auditorium (which is now the library). The organ was paid for by funds raised by the student body, putting on a production of "Peter Pan" at the Hollywood Bowl. Louis Vierne played his only Southern California performance at Hollywood High in 1927, and Edwin Lemare played his last public performance at Hollywood High School while his daughter, Mary, was attending school there in 1931. Other famous organists have played there, including Virgil Fox.  Felix Hell played the first public concert on the newly renovated organ in October 2002.

Damage and restoration
The organ, under the care of Williamson-Warne & Associates, was in reasonably good playing condition until the Northridge earthquake of 1994. The organ survived fairly well, basically sustaining damage in the form of a few broken pipes, and a couple of racks that pulled out of the wall. What no one realized is that the earthquake had damaged the roof above both of the organ chambers, and when Hollywood experienced a heavy winter rain the following week, both organ chambers took on a lot of water and severely damaged the mechanisms.

After several years of neglect, in 2000,a restoration project on the organ was begun.  The school with the help of the Organ Historical Society of America and headed by Austin Organs, Inc., of Hartford, Connecticut, worked towards its rebuilding which was completed in May 2002.

Hollywood, Hollywood High Organ Opus 481
Culture of Hollywood, Los Angeles